Michael Beale may refer to:

 Michael Beale (football coach) (born 1980), English football manager
 Michael Beale (cricketer) (born 1947), English former cricketer